Gagik I was the king of Armenia who reigned between 989 and 1020, under whom Bagratid Armenia reached its height, and "enjoyed the accustomed experience of unbroken peace and prosperity."

Rule

It is unknown when Gagik I was born. He succeeded his brother Smbat II in 989. He followed the footsteps of his predecessors in building churches and religious buildings in the capital Ani. Using the favorable economic conditions of Armenia, Gagik increased the size of the army up to 100,000 soldiers. He subsequently united various Armenian provinces to Bagratid Armenia, including Vayots Dzor, Khachen, Nakhichevan and the city of Dvin. He made alliances with Gurgen of Iberia and Bagrat III of Georgia, whose armies defeated Mamlan, the emir of Khorasan, in 998 in the village of Tsumb, northeast of Lake Van. Under Gagik I, the Kingdom of Armenia extended from Shamkor to Vagharshakert and Kura River to Apahunik near Lake Van. The country's economy, culture and foreign trade developed; Ani, Dvin, and Kars flourished. He has joined to his territory Vanadzor, the most part of Artsakh (Khachen) and two main provinces of Vaspurakan: Kogovit and Ttsaghkotn. 

After his death, his elder son, Hovhannes-Smbat, was crowned king while his younger son, Ashot, rebelled against Smbat and proclaimed his independence in the Kingdom of Lori-Dzoraget.

Archaeological finds

One of Gagik's principal projects was the Church of St. Gregory in Ani (1001–10), loosely modeled on Zvartnots. During Nicholas Marr's excavation of the city's ruins in 1906, a 2.26-meter high statue of King Gagik holding a model of his church was found in fragments. It shows Gagik wearing a turban on his head and a khalat, which indicates that he was recognized by the Abbasid Caliphate. The statue was originally located in a niche high up in the north facade of the church. It was lost in uncertain circumstances at the end of the First World War. Only a few photographs record its appearance. A surviving fragment of the statue is now in the Erzurum archaeological museum. Exactly how, and when, it got there is unknown. According to the museum staff it was found somewhere in the vicinity of Erzurum and the finder brought it to the museum by car.

Notes

References

Kings of Bagratid Armenia
Bagratuni dynasty
11th-century monarchs in Asia
10th-century monarchs in Asia
1020 deaths
Year of birth unknown
10th-century Armenian people
11th-century Armenian people